Lori Carr is a Canadian politician, who was elected to the Legislative Assembly of Saskatchewan in the 2016 provincial election. She represents the electoral district of Estevan as a member of the Saskatchewan Party. On August 15, 2018, she was appointed to Cabinet as Minister of Highways and Infrastructure. She was shuffled to the Government Relations portfolio on August 13, 2019.  She became Minister of Social Services on November 9, 2020, following the Saskatchewan Party's victory in the provincial election of October 26, 2020.

References

Living people
Saskatchewan Party MLAs
Women MLAs in Saskatchewan
21st-century Canadian politicians
21st-century Canadian women politicians
Year of birth missing (living people)